National Highway 151 (NH 151) is a national highway in India. It is a secondary route of National Highway 51.  NH-151 runs in the state of Gujarat in India.

Route 

NH151 connects Gadu, Vanthali, Junagadh and Jetpur in the state of Gujarat.

Junctions  
 
  Terminal near Gad

  near Jetpur
  Terminal near Jetpur.

See also 
 List of National Highways in India
 List of National Highways in India by state

References

External links 
 NH 151 on OpenStreetMap

National highways in India
National Highways in Gujarat